Aliya Kamran is a Pakistani politician who has been a member of the National Assembly of Pakistan, since August 2018. Previously she was a member of the National Assembly from June 2013 to May 2018.

Political career

She was elected to the National Assembly of Pakistan as a candidate of Jamiat Ulema-e-Islam (F) on reserved seats for women from Balochistan in 2013 Pakistani general election.

She was re-elected to the National Assembly as a candidate of Muttahida Majlis-e-Amal (MMA) on a reserved seat for women from Balochistan in 2018 Pakistani general election.

References

Living people
Pakistani MNAs 2013–2018
Year of birth missing (living people)
Place of birth missing (living people)
Jamiat Ulema-e-Islam (F) politicians
Women members of the National Assembly of Pakistan
Pakistani MNAs 2018–2023
Muttahida Majlis-e-Amal MNAs
21st-century Pakistani women politicians